The 2000 Big 12 Conference women's soccer tournament was the postseason women's soccer tournament for the Big 12 Conference held from November 1 to 4, 2000. The 7-match tournament was held at the Blossom Athletic Center in San Antonio, TX with a combined attendance of 3,999. The 8-team single-elimination tournament consisted of three rounds based on seeding from regular season conference play. The Nebraska Cornhuskers defeated the Texas A&M Aggies in the championship match to win their 4th conference tournament.

Regular Season Standings
Source:

Bracket

Awards

Most valuable player
Source:
Offensive MVP – Christine Latham – Nebraska
Defensive MVP – Amber Reynolds – Texas A&M

All-Tournament team

References 

 
Big 12 Conference Women's Soccer Tournament